Ljubičevac is name of two places in Serbia:
 Ljubičevac (Kladovo), in Bor District
 Ljubičevac (Stragari), in Šumadija District